The Avra Valley Solar Generating Station is a 34 MW (DC, 25 MW AC) photovoltaic power plant in Avra Valley, Pima County, Arizona, owned by NRG. It uses single axis tracking that is designed to be maintenance free over the twenty year design life of the system. The panels are mounted on a north-south axis and rotate each day to follow the sun from sunrise to sunset, increasing the output by about 20%. Power is being sold to Tucson Electric Power in a 20-year power purchase agreement.

Production

See also 

 Solar power in Arizona

References 

Solar power stations in Arizona
Photovoltaic power stations in the United States
Buildings and structures in Pima County, Arizona
NRG Energy